is a Japanese politician of the Liberal Democratic Party, a member of the House of Councillors in the Diet (national legislature). A graduate of Waseda University and former member of the assembly of Shizuoka Prefecture, he was elected to the House of Councillors for the first time in 2007.

References

External links 
  in Japanese.

1959 births
Living people
Waseda University alumni
Members of the House of Councillors (Japan)
Liberal Democratic Party (Japan) politicians